The Department of Housing Preservation and Development (HPD) is the department of the government of New York City responsible for developing and maintaining the city's stock of affordable housing. Its regulations are compiled in title 28 of the New York City Rules. The Department is headed by a Commissioner, who is appointed by and reports directly to the Mayor. The current Commissioner of HPD is Adolfo Carrión Jr. appointed in January, 2022 by Mayor Eric Adams replacing Louise Carroll, who was appointed by Mayor Bill de Blasio in May 2019. Other former Commissioners have included Maria Torres-Springer, Vicki Been, Jerilyn Perine, Richard Roberts and Shaun Donovan, among others. HPD is headquartered in Lower Manhattan, and includes smaller branch offices in each of the city's five boroughs.

Overview
Established in 1978 in the wake of Local Law 45 of 1976, the Department is the largest municipal developer of affordable housing in the United States. HPD is currently in the midst of New York City Mayor Bill de Blasio's Housing New York initiative to create and preserve 300,000 units of affordable housing by 2026. By the end of 2021, the City of New York financed more than 200,000 affordable homes since 2014, breaking the all-time record previously set by former Mayor Ed Koch. The Agency also enforces the City's Housing Maintenance Code, which covers heat and hot water, mold, pests, gas leaks, fire safety, and more. HPD performs over 500,000 inspections annually and uses a variety of other Code Enforcement tools to address building conditions from performing owner outreach to bringing cases in Housing Court to performing emergency repairs. Lastly, the Agency engages neighborhoods in planning, working with other City agencies and communities to plan for the preservation and development of affordable housing to foster more equitable, diverse, and livable neighborhoods.

Organization
Commissioner
First Deputy Commissioner
Assistant Commissioner for Economic Opportunity and Regulatory Compliance
Deputy Commissioner for Asset and Property Management
Deputy Commissioner of Technology and Chief Information Officer
Deputy Commissioner for Financial Management
Deputy Commissioner for External Affairs
Deputy Commissioner for Policy & Strategy
Deputy Commissioner for Neighborhood Strategies and Tenant Resources
Deputy Commissioner for Enforcement and Neighborhood Services
Deputy Commissioner for Development
Deputy Commissioner for Legal Affairs

See also
New York City Housing Authority
Affordable housing in New York City
Article 7A (NYC housing code)

Notes

References

External links 
New York City Department of Housing Preservation and Development
 Department of Housing Preservation and Development in the Rules of the City of New York
New York City Housing Development Corporation in the New York Codes, Rules and Regulations
New York Housing Development Corporation

Housing Preservation and Development
Housing in New York City
1978 establishments in New York (state)